Azizabad-e Sheybani (also Romanized as ʿAzīzābād-e Sheybānī) is a village in Aliabad Rural District, in the Central District of Anbarabad County, Kerman Province, Iran. At the 2006 census, its population was 141, in 27 families.

References 

Populated places in Anbarabad County